John Gilchrist may refer to:

John Gilchrist (linguist) (1759–1841), Scottish surgeon and Indologist
John Gilchrist (Province of Canada politician) (1792–1859), politician in Province of Canada
John Gilchrist (judge) (1809–1858), American judge
John Gilchrist (zoologist) (1866–1926), Scottish South African ichthyologist
John Gilchrist (New Zealand politician) (1872–1947), political activist in New Zealand
John Gilchrist (footballer, born 1900) (1900–1950), Scottish footballer
John Gilchrist (cricketer) (born 1932), English cricketer
John Gilchrist (footballer, born 1939) (1939–1991), Scottish footballer
John Gilchrist (actor) (born 1968), former child actor
John Gilchrist (basketball) (born 1985), American basketball player